California's 16th congressional district is a congressional district in the U.S. state of California. It includes portions of Santa Clara, San Mateo, and Santa Cruz counties, extending from the southwestern San Francisco Bay Area through the Santa Cruz Mountains to the Pacific coast.

On 20 December 2021, the state redistricting commission unanimously approved a new map of congressional districts, under which the new District 16 overlaps largely with the old District 18. The primary election of June 2022 was the first to feature the new districts; however, sitting representatives will reflect the old district boundaries until the general election in November 2022.

Prior to the 2020s redistricting, the district included Merced County, most of Madera County, and part of Fresno County. During this time, cities in the district included Los Banos, Madera, Merced, and most of Fresno. The new 16th district is in San Mateo County and Santa Clara County and includes Pacifica, Half Moon Bay, Atherton, Palo Alto, Saratoga, Campbell, Woodside and Los Gatos, and the south-central and southwestern parts of San Jose. Most of the old 16th district is now part of the 13th and 21st districts.

Recent election results from statewide races

Composition

As of the 2020 redistricting, California's 16th congressional district is located in the San Francisco Bay Area. It encompasses the west coast and interior of San Mateo County, and the western border of Santa Clara County.

San Mateo County is split between this district and the 15th district. They are partitioned by the San Francisquito Creek, Menalto Ave, Willow Rd, S Perimeter Rd, W Perimeter Rd, Bay Rd, Marsh Rd, Middlefield Rd, Highway 82, Highway 84, Alameda de las Pulgas, Woodhill Dr, Farm Hill Blvd, The Loop Rd, Jefferson Ave, Summit Way, California Way, Junipero Serra Freeway, and Highway 35. The 16th district takes in the cities of Pacifica, Menlo Park, and Half Moon Bay, California.

Santa Clara County is split between this district, the 17th district, the 18th district, and the 19th district. The 16th and 19th are partitioned by Old Santa Cruz Highway, Aldercroft Hts Rd, Weaver Rd, Soda Springs Rd, Love Harris Rd, Pheasant Creek, Guadalupe Creek, Guadalupe Mines Rd, Oak Canyon Dr, Coleman Rd, Meridian Ave, Highway G8, Guadalupe River, W Capitol Expressway, Senter Rd, Sylvandale Ave, Yerba Buena Rd, Silver Creek Rd, and E Capitol Expressway. The 16th and 18th are partitioned by Annona Ave Santiago Ave, Tully Rd, Highway 101, S King Rd, Valley Palms Apts, Story Rd, Senter Rd, E Alma Ave, S 7th St, Monterey Rd, Barnard Ave, Highway G8, Highway 87, W Alma Ave, Belmont Way, Belmont Ave, Minnesota Ave, Prevost St, Atlanta Ave, Fuller Ave, Riverside Dr, Coe Ave, Lincoln Ave, Paula St, Highway 280, and Highway 880. The 16th and 17th are partitioned by Stevens Creek Blvd, Santana Row, Olsen Dr, S Winchester Blvd, Williams Rd, Eden Ave, Lexington Dr, Valley Forge Way, Gleason Ave, Moreland Way, Payne Ave, Saratoga Ave, Doyle Rd, Highway G2, Royal Ann Dr, Wisteria Way, Rainbow Dr, Highway 85, S De Anza Blvd, Prospect Rd, Fremont Older Open Space, Permanente Creek, Highway 280, N Foothill Blvd, Homestead Rd, Stevens Creek, W EL Camino Real, Magritte Way, Highway G6, Highway 101, and Enterprise Way. 

The 16th district takes in the west central section of the city of San Jose, the cities of Campbell, Saratoga, Los Gatos, Los Altos, Mountain View, and the census-designated place Stanford, which includes Stanford University.

Cities & CDP with 10,000 or more people
 San Jose - 1,013,240
 Mountain View - 82,376
 Palo Alto - 68,572
 Campbell - 43,959
 Los Gatos - 33,529
 Los Altos - 31,625
 Saratoga - 31,051
 Stanford - 21,150

List of members representing the district

Election results

1932

1934

1936

1938

1940

1942

1944

1946

1948

1950

1952

1954

1956

1958

1960

1962

1964

1966

1968

1970

1972

1974

1976

1978

1980

1982

1984

1986

1988

1990

1992

1994

1996

1998

2000

2002

2004

2006

2008

2010

2012

2014

2016

2018

2020

Historical district boundaries

See also
List of United States congressional districts

References

External links
GovTrack.us: California's 16th congressional district
RAND California Election Returns: District Definitions
California Voter Foundation map - CD16

16
Government of Fresno County, California
Government of Madera County, California
Government of Merced County, California
Fresno, California
Los Banos, California
Merced, California
Madera, California
San Joaquin Valley
Constituencies established in 1933
1933 establishments in California